The Hill is an upcoming American biographical sports drama film directed by Jeff Celentano and written by Angelo Pizzo and Scott Marshall Smith.  It stars Dennis Quaid, Colin Ford, Joelle Carter, Randy Houser, Bonnie Bedelia and Scott Glenn.

The film is scheduled to be released in theaters on August 18, 2023, by Briarcliff Entertainment.

Premise
The film is based on the true story of Rickey Hill overcoming a physical handicap in order to become a Major League Baseball (MLB) player.

Cast
 Dennis Quaid as James Hill
 Colin Ford as Rickey Hill
 Jesse Berry as young Rickey Hill
 Joelle Carter as Hellen Hill, Rickey's mother
 Randy Houser as Ray Clemons, a man from Rickey's childhood who encourages him to try out for the MLB
 Scott Glenn as Red Murff, the MLB scout who discovers Rickey
 Bonnie Bedelia

Production
In August 2021, Deadline reported that Dennis Quaid joined the cast of the sports drama film The  Hill, with Jeff Celentano directing from a script by Angelo Pizzo and Scott Marshall Smith.  Quaid plays Pastor James Hill while Colin Ford plays his son Rickey Hill. This was Smith's final film before his death in December 2020.

Celentano said, "I'm setting out to make an iconic film in the classic sense, a beautiful sweeping and powerful inspirational story. One that will stand the test of time like Blindside, Rudy, Field of Dreams and The Natural. Dennis was the first and only person I thought of for the lead role upon reading the script."

Principal photography took place in Augusta, Georgia and the surrounding Columbia County region from November to December 2021. Other locations included the Lake Olmstead Stadium and Central Savannah River Area.

Release
The Hill is scheduled to have a wide theatrical release on August 18, 2023, by Briarcliff Entertainment.

References

External links
 
 

2023 drama films
2020s American films
2020s biographical drama films
2020s English-language films
2020s sports drama films
American baseball films
American biographical drama films
American sports drama films
Biographical films about sportspeople
Cultural depictions of baseball players
Films about disability in the United States
Films about Major League Baseball
Films directed by Jeff Celentano
Films scored by Geoff Zanelli
Films shot in Georgia (U.S. state)
Upcoming English-language films